Peter Malone may refer to:

 Peter Malone (swimming coach), swimming coach from the United States
 Peter Malone (mayor) (1928–2006), mayor of Nelson, New Zealand, 1980–1992
 Gerry Malone (Peter Gerald Malone, born 1950), British politician